Indrek Hirv (born 15 December 1956 in Kohila) is an Estonian poet, translator and artist.

In 1981 he graduated from State Art Institute of the Estonian SSR, studied ceramics.

In 1988 he established Konrad Mägi Studio of the Tartu Art Association; being also the first director of this studio.

Since 1985, he is a member of Estonian Artists' Union and since 1991 Estonian Writers' Union.

Works
 1980: poetry collection "Uneraev" ('Sleep-rage')
 2012: poetry collection "Tiivavalu"
 2016: poetry collection "Toomemägi on Emajõgi"

References

Living people
1956 births
Estonian male poets
Estonian translators
Estonian children's writers
20th-century Estonian writers
20th-century Estonian poets
21st-century Estonian writers
21st-century Estonian poets
Recipients of the Order of the White Star, 4th Class
Estonian painters
Hugo Treffner Gymnasium alumni
People from Kohila